Kaliella is a genus of air-breathing land snails or semi-slugs, terrestrial pulmonate gastropod mollusks in the family Chronidae.

Distribution 
The distribution of the genus Kaliella includes:
 Hong Kong
 Laos
 Vietnam
 Uganda (2 species)
 ...

Species
Species within the genus Kaliella include:
 
 Kaliella accepta (E. A. Smith, 1895)
 Kaliella ahitsitondronae Salvat, 1966
 Kaliella ammastoma B. Rensch, 1932
 Kaliella animula Godwin-Austen, 1882
 Kaliella aspirans (W. T. Blanford & H. F. Blanford, 1861)
 Kaliella barrakporensis (L. Pfeiffer, 1852)
 Kaliella bhasini Rajagopalaingar, 1953
 Kaliella bhutanensis Godwin-Austen, 1907
 Kaliella bullula (Benson, 1838)
 Kaliella burrailensis Godwin-Austen, 1883
 Kaliella cavicola (Gredler, 1881)
 Kaliella chekiangensis Yen, 1948
 Kaliella chennelli Godwin-Austen, 1883
 Kaliella cherraensis Godwin-Austen, 1882
 Kaliella chondrium Quadras & Möllendorff, 1896
 Kaliella colletti Sykes, 1899
 Kaliella comorensis Fischer-Piette & Vukadinovic, 1974
 Kaliella costata Pilsbry & Hirase, 1905
 Kaliella costigera Möllendorff, 1887
 Kaliella crandalli K. C. Emberton, Slapcinsky, Campbell, Rakotondrazafy, Andriamiarison & J. D. Emberton, 2010
 Kaliella cruda E. A. Smith, 1909
 Kaliella delectabilis Sykes, 1898
 Kaliella dendrobates (Tillier & Bouchet, 1989)
 Kaliella dendrophila (van Benthem Jutting, 1950)
 Kaliella dentifera Quadras & Möllendorff, 1894
 Kaliella depauperata Preston, 1912
 Kaliella depressa Möllendorff, 1883
 Kaliella difficilis Möllendorff, 1900
 Kaliella dikrangensis Godwin-Austen, 1883
 Kaliella ditropis (Quadras & Möllendorff, 1894)
 Kaliella dolichoconus Möllendorff, 1901
 Kaliella doliolum (L. Pfeiffer, 1846)
 Kaliella dorri (Wattebled, 1886)
 Kaliella elongata Godwin-Austen, 1882
 Kaliella euconuloides Melvill & Ponsonby, 1908
 Kaliella euconus Möllendorff, 1899
 Kaliella eurytrochus Vermeulen, Liew & Schilthuizen, 2015
 Kaliella fastigiata (T. Hutton, 1838)
 Kaliella flatura Godwin-Austen, 1882
 Kaliella fourneauxensis Godwin-Austen, 1908
 Kaliella franciscana (Gredler, 1881)
 Kaliella gradata Möllendorff, 1901
 Kaliella gratiosa Godwin-Austen, 1882
 Kaliella gregaria (Tillier & Bouchet, 1989)
 Kaliella hongkongensis Möllendorff, 1883
 Kaliella humilis (Tillier & Bouchet, 1989)
 Kaliella infantilis (E. A. Smith, 1895)
 Kaliella iredalei Preston, 1912
 Kaliella jaintiaca Godwin-Austen, 1882
 Kaliella joubini Dautzenberg & H. Fischer, 1905
 † Kaliella kaliellaeformis (Klebs, 1886) 
 Kaliella kezamahensis Godwin-Austen, 1883
 Kaliella khasiaca Godwin-Austen, 1882
 Kaliella kinabaluensis (Tillier & Bouchet, 1989)
 Kaliella kjellerupi Mörch, 1872
 Kaliella lailangkotensis Godwin-Austen, 1883
 Kaliella lamprocystis Möllendorff, 1899
 Kaliella leithiana Godwin-Austen, 1883
 Kaliella leucotropis Quadras & Möllendorff, 1896
 Kaliella lhotaensis Godwin-Austen, 1882
 Kaliella micracyna Saurin, 1953
 Kaliella microconus (Mousson, 1865)
 Kaliella micropetasus Möllendorff, 1893
 Kaliella microsoma Vermeulen, Liew & Schilthuizen, 2015
 Kaliella microtholus Möllendorff, 1895
 Kaliella miliacea (Martens, 1867)
 Kaliella minutissima Godwin-Austen, 1914
 Kaliella monticola Möllendorff, 1884
 Kaliella munipurensis Godwin-Austen, 1882
 Kaliella muongomensis Saurin, 1953
 Kaliella nagaensis Godwin-Austen, 1882
 Kaliella nana (T. Hutton, 1850)
 Kaliella nematorhaphe Möllendorff, 1898
 Kaliella nephelophila (Tillier & Bouchet, 1989)
 Kaliella nongsteinensis Godwin-Austen, 1883
 Kaliella novopommerana I. Rensch, 1932
 Kaliella opaca Quadras & Möllendorff, 1896
 Kaliella ordinaria Ancey, 1904
 Kaliella oxyconus (Möllendorff, 1894)
 Kaliella paucistriata Godwin-Austen, 1907
 Kaliella peliosanthi (Mörch, 1872)
 Kaliella phacomorpha Vermeulen, Liew & Schilthuizen, 2015
 Kaliella polygyra Möllendorff, 1884
 Kaliella pseudositala Möllendorff, 1888
 Kaliella punctata Vermeulen, Liew & Schilthuizen, 2015
 Kaliella pusilla Möllendorff, 1888
 Kaliella pyramidata Yen, 1939
 Kaliella radicita Godwin-Austen, 1914
 Kaliella regularis Möllendorff, 1901
 Kaliella resinula Godwin-Austen, 1882
 Kaliella richilaensis Godwin-Austen, 1907
 Kaliella rissomensis Godwin-Austen, 1907
 Kaliella ruga Godwin-Austen, 1883
 Kaliella rupicola Möllendorff, 1883
 Kaliella salicensis Godwin-Austen, 1897
 Kaliella seckingeriana (Heude, 1882)
 Kaliella shillongensis Godwin-Austen, 1907
 Kaliella sikkimensis Godwin-Austen, 1888
 Kaliella soulaiana Fischer-Piette, 1973
 Kaliella spelaea (Heude, 1882)
 Kaliella stenopleuris Möllendorff, 1887
 Kaliella striolata (Möllendorff, 1901)
 Kaliella stylodonta Quadras & Möllendorff, 1895
 Kaliella subelongata Bavay & Dautzenberg, 1912
 Kaliella sublaxa Vermeulen, Liew & Schilthuizen, 2015
 Kaliella subnodosa Möllendorff, 1898
 Kaliella subsculpta Möllendorff, 1894
 Kaliella tenellula (Mabille, 1887)
 Kaliella teriaensis Godwin-Austen, 1882
 Kaliella tholus Godwin-Austen, 1914
 Kaliella timorensis B. Rensch, 1935
 Kaliella tirutana Godwin-Austen, 1888
 Kaliella tongkingensis Möllendorff, 1901
 Kaliella tonglonensis Möllendorff, 1898
 Kaliella transitans Möllendorff, 1893
 Kaliella vagata (E. A. Smith, 1902)
 Kaliella victoriae Preston, 1912
 Kaliella vulcani Godwin-Austen, 1882

References

 Bavay, A. & Dautzenberg, P., 1904 Description de coquilles nouvelles de l'Indo-Chine Journal de Conchyliologie, 51"1903" 201-236
 Fischer-Piette, E., 1950. Liste des types décrits dans le Journal de Conchyliologie et conservés dans la collection de ce journal (avec planches)(suite). Journal de Conchyliologie 90: 149-180
 Tillier S. & Bouchet P. (1989). Land snails and slugs from the upper montane zone of Mt Kinabalu (Sabah, Borneo), with descriptions of new species and genera. Indo-Malayan Zoology. 5 ("1988"): 255–293, 9 plates
 Bank, R. A. (2017). Classification of the Recent terrestrial Gastropoda of the World. Last update: July 16th, 2017
Annotated checklist of the terrestrial molluscs from Laos (Mollusca, Gastropoda). ZooKeys 834: 1-166

External links
 Blanford, W. T. (1863). On Indian species of land-shells belonging to the genera Helix, Linn., and Nanina, Gray. The Annals and Magazine of Natural History, Series 3. 11(62): 81-86
 Iredale T. (1937). A basic list of the land Mollusca of Australia. Part II. Australian Zoologist. 9: 1-39
 Ancey, C. F. (1887). Description of new genera or subgenera of Helicidæ. The Conchologists' Exchange. 1(9-10): 53-54 [30 April; 1(11): 64 [May]; 1(12): 75-76 [28 June]; 2(2):22-23]
  Godwin-Austen H.H. (1882-1920). Land and freshwater Mollusca of India, including South Arabia, Baluchistan, Afghanistan, Kashmir, Nepal, Burmah, Pegu, Tenasserim, Malay Peninsula, Ceylon, and other islands of the Indian Ocean. Supplementary to Messrs. Theobald and Hanley's Conchologia Indica. London, Taylor & Francis.
 Möllendorff, O. F. von. (1898). Verzeichnis der auf den Philippinen lebenden Landmollusken. Abhandlungen der Naturforschenden Gesellschaft zu Görlitz. 22: 26-208

Chronidae
Taxonomy articles created by Polbot